

448001–448100 

|-id=051
| 448051 Pepisensi ||  || Josefa "Pepi" (born 1993) and Ascension "Sensi" (born 1994) are the respective daughters of Spanish astronomers Sensi Pastor and José Antonio Reyes, who discovered this minor planet. During their teenage years, they spent long nights waiting for the return of their parents from the La Murta Observatory . || 
|}

448101–448200 

|-bgcolor=#f2f2f2
| colspan=4 align=center | 
|}

448201–448300 

|-bgcolor=#f2f2f2
| colspan=4 align=center | 
|}

448301–448400 

|-bgcolor=#f2f2f2
| colspan=4 align=center | 
|}

448401–448500 

|-bgcolor=#f2f2f2
| colspan=4 align=center | 
|}

448501–448600 

|-bgcolor=#f2f2f2
| colspan=4 align=center | 
|}

448601–448700 

|-bgcolor=#f2f2f2
| colspan=4 align=center | 
|}

448701–448800 

|-bgcolor=#f2f2f2
| colspan=4 align=center | 
|}

448801–448900 

|-bgcolor=#f2f2f2
| colspan=4 align=center | 
|}

448901–449000 

|-id=988
| 448988 Changzhong ||  || Changzhong (Changzhou Senior High School of Jiangsu Province) is located in the historic city of Changzhou, China. Founded in 1907, the school has educated students who have made contributions to the reform and development of Chinese society, including more than 20 academicians of the Chinese Academy of Sciences and the Chinese Academy of Engineering. || 
|}

References 

448001-449000